German submarine U-104 was a Type IXB U-boat of Nazi Germany's Kriegsmarine during World War II. She was ordered by the Kriegsmarine on 24 May 1938 as part of the German naval rearmament program Plan Z. Her keel was laid down by DeSchiMAG AG Weser in Bremen in November 1939. Following about six and a half months of construction, she was launched on 25 May 1940 and formally commissioned into the Kriegsmarine on  19 August 1940.

U-104 had a very short career, sinking just one enemy vessel and damaging one other during one war patrol. In the middle of her first patrol, U-104 was posted missing off the north coast of Ireland on 30 November 1940 and was presumed sunk in minefield SN 44, which was laid a few days prior to her arrival in the area.

Construction and design

Construction

U-104 was ordered by the Kriegsmarine on 24 May 1938 (as part of Plan Z and in violation of the Treaty of Versailles). Her keel was laid down on 10 November 1939 by DeSchiMAG AG Weser in Bremen as yard number 967. U-104 was launched on 25 May 1940 and commissioned on 19 August of that year under the command of Kapitänleutnant Harald Jürst.

Design
German Type IXA submarines were slightly larger than the original German Type IX submarines, later designated IXA. U-104 had a displacement of  when at the surface and  while submerged. She had two shafts and two  propellers.

U-104 was fitted with six  torpedo tubes (four fitted at the bow and two at the stern), 22 torpedoes, one  SK C/32 naval gun, 180 rounds, and a  SK C/30 as well as a  C/30 anti-aircraft gun. The boat had a complement of forty-eight.

Service history
During her short career, U-104 sank one enemy vessel and damaged another on her first and only war patrol in the North Sea, off the northern coast of Ireland and Great Britain. She went to sea on her first and only war patrol on 12 November 1940. For a period of 17 days, she roamed the North Sea and eventually the northern coast of Scotland and Ireland in search of any Allied convoys heading to Great Britain. During that time she attacked two enemy vessels, sinking one and damaging the other. On 27 November 1940, U-104 torpedoed and sank the British merchant vessel Diplomat, a straggler of convoy HX 88, with the loss of 14 of her crew. The other merchant vessel was the British motor tanker Charles F. Meyer, of convoy HX 87, which survived the attack. The next day, U-104 went missing just north of neutral Ireland. She is presumed to have been sunk by a mine from the SN 44 minefield, which was laid on 8 November 1940, just 20 days prior to U-104s disappearance. All of her crew are presumed dead.

Summary of raiding history

References

Bibliography

External links

German Type IX submarines
U-boats commissioned in 1940
U-boats sunk in 1940
World War II submarines of Germany
1940 ships
Ships built in Bremen (state)
U-boats sunk by mines
Maritime incidents in November 1940